Mohammed Lamine Cissé (born 15 February 2003) is a French professional footballer who plays as a winger for  club Nancy.

Club career
On 20 April 2020, Cissé signed his first professional contract with AS Nancy Lorraine. He made his senior debut with Nancy in a 3–1 Ligue 2 loss to Valenciennes FC on 1 May 2021.

International career
Born in France, Cissé is of Guinean descent. He is a youth international for France.

References

External links
 
 FFF Profile Profile

2003 births
Living people
Sportspeople from Créteil
French footballers
France youth international footballers
French sportspeople of Senegalese descent
Association football wingers
AS Nancy Lorraine players
Ligue 2 players
Championnat National 3 players
Footballers from Val-de-Marne